Jean-Paul Mendy (born December 14, 1973 in Mantes-la-Jolie, Yvelines) is a professional boxer from France, who won the bronze medal in the middleweight division (– 75 kg) at the 1997 World Amateur Boxing Championships in Budapest, Hungary.

Amateur
The southpaw represented his native country at the 1996 Summer Olympics in Atlanta, where he was defeated in the first round by Germany's Sven Ottke on points (4-11).

Pro
Jean-Paul made his professional debut on December 22, 2000, when he beat countryman Guy Dia-Njoh on knock-out in the second round. He was undefeated as professional for 29 matches.

Mendy fought Sakio Bika on July 31 in Las Vegas, for an IBF #1 spot and a shot at the title. Bika lost the fight by disqualification in the 1st round after he knocked Mendy out with a punch following a knockdown and while Mendy was still on his knees.

Challenging Bute 
On July 9, 2011, Mendy fought for the IBF Super Middleweight title against Lucian Bute in his native country, Romania, in an event which took place at Romexpo in the capital Bucharest. Jean-Paul Mendy lost the title match via knockout at 2:48 in the fourth round.

Professional boxing record 

|-
|align="center" colspan=8|29 Wins (16 knockouts, 12 decisions 1  disqualification), 1 Losses (1 knockout, 0 decision), 1 Draws
|-
| align="center" style="border-style: none none solid solid; background: #e3e3e3"|Res.
| align="center" style="border-style: none none solid solid; background: #e3e3e3"|Record
| align="center" style="border-style: none none solid solid; background: #e3e3e3"|Opponent
| align="center" style="border-style: none none solid solid; background: #e3e3e3"|Type
| align="center" style="border-style: none none solid solid; background: #e3e3e3"|Rd., Time
| align="center" style="border-style: none none solid solid; background: #e3e3e3"|Date
| align="center" style="border-style: none none solid solid; background: #e3e3e3"|Location
| align="center" style="border-style: none none solid solid; background: #e3e3e3"|Notes
|-align=center
|Loss
|
|align=left| 
| ||  ||
|align=left|
|align=left|
|-align=center
|Win
|
|align=left| 
| ||  ||
|align=left|
|align=left|
|-align=center
|Win
|
|align=left| 
| ||  ||
|align=left|
|align=left|
|-align=center
|Win
|
|align=left| 
| ||  ||
|align=left|
|align=left|
|-align=center
|Win
|
|align=left| 
| ||  ||
|align=left|
|align=left|
|-align=center
|Win
|
|align=left| 
| ||  ||
|align=left|
|align=left|
|-align=center
|Win
|
|align=left| 
| ||  ||
|align=left|
|align=left|
|-align=center
|style="background: #B0C4DE"|Draw 
|
|align=left| 
| ||  ||
|align=left|
|align=left|
|-align=center
|Win
|
|align=left| 
| ||  ||
|align=left|
|align=left|
|-align=center
|Win
|
|align=left| 
| ||  ||
|align=left|
|align=left|
|-align=center
|Win
|
|align=left| 
| ||  ||
|align=left|
|align=left|
|-align=center
|Win
|
|align=left| 
| ||  ||
|align=left|
|align=left|
|-align=center
|Win
|
|align=left| 
| ||  ||
|align=left|
|align=left|
|-align=center
|Win
|
|align=left| 
| ||  ||
|align=left|
|align=left|
|-align=center
|Win
|
|align=left| 
| ||  ||
|align=left|
|align=left|
|-align=center
|Win
|
|align=left| 
| ||  ||
|align=left|
|align=left|
|-align=center
|Win
|
|align=left| 
| ||  ||
|align=left|
|align=left|
|-align=center
|Win
|
|align=left| 
| ||  ||
|align=left|
|align=left|
|-align=center
|Win
|
|align=left| 
| ||  ||
|align=left|
|align=left|
|-align=center
|Win
|
|align=left| 
| ||  ||
|align=left|
|align=left|
|-align=center
|Win
|
|align=left| 
| ||  ||
|align=left|
|align=left|
|-align=center
|Win
|
|align=left| 
| ||  ||
|align=left|
|align=left|
|-align=center
|Win
|
|align=left| 
| ||  ||
|align=left|
|align=left|
|-align=center
|Win
|
|align=left| 
| ||  ||
|align=left|
|align=left|
|-align=center
|Win
|
|align=left| 
| ||  ||
|align=left|
|align=left|
|-align=center
|Win
|
|align=left| 
| ||  ||
|align=left|
|align=left|
|-align=center
|Win
|
|align=left| 
| ||  ||
|align=left|
|align=left|
|-align=center
|Win
|
|align=left| 
| ||  ||
|align=left|
|align=left|
|-align=center
|Win
|
|align=left| 
| ||  ||
|align=left|
|align=left|
|-align=center
|Win
|
|align=left| 
| ||  ||
|align=left|
|align=left|
|-align=center
|Win
|
|align=left| 
| ||  ||
|align=left|
|align=left|
|-align=center

References

External links
 
 

1973 births
Living people
People from Mantes-la-Jolie
French sportspeople of Senegalese descent
Middleweight boxers
Boxers at the 1996 Summer Olympics
Olympic boxers of France
French male boxers
AIBA World Boxing Championships medalists
Sportspeople from Yvelines
Mediterranean Games silver medalists for France
Mediterranean Games medalists in boxing
Competitors at the 1997 Mediterranean Games